The Associate in Music, Australia (AMusA) is a diploma awarded by examination to outstanding candidates in the fields of musical performance and music theory by the Australian Music Examinations Board (AMEB).

Description
AMEB administers music examinations in Australia, and its Associate diploma is considered a prestigious award, equivalent to achieving an undergraduate tertiary qualification in Music.  Typically, a candidate will have already completed AMEB Level 2 exams up to Grade 8 or Certificate of Performance prior to attempting the AMusA, although there is no requirement for this.  The requirement is to have successfully completed a Grade 5 theory examination for a practical AMusA, and a Grade 5 practical examination for a theory AMusA.  Above the AMusA is the very prestigious diploma of Licentiate in Music, Australia (LMusA) and the most prestigious but extremely rare Fellowship in Music, Australia (FMusA).

An AMusA practical examination is conducted by two examiners. Candidates must present a repertoire from the prescribed lists of pieces that is 25–40 minutes in length, with a further ten minutes testing musical general knowledge of the pieces presented.  Candidates receive one of three grades at diploma level: "no award", "award", and the exceptional "award with distinction". As the AMEB is considered the benchmark of music examination boards in Australia, achieving this award is seen as prestigious, and signifies a high performance standard.

Categories
The AMusA is awarded in these categories:

Theory:
Theory of Music in Musicology, Harmony & Counterpoint or Orchestration & Arrangement.
Musicianship

Keyboard:
Piano
Organ
Accordion
Electronic Organ
Percussion

Strings
Violin
Viola
Cello
Double Bass
Classical Guitar
Harp

Woodwind
Recorder
Flute
Oboe
Clarinet
Bassoon
Saxophone

Orchestral Brass
Horn
Trumpet
Trombone
Tuba
Euphonium

Brass Band
Instruments in B flat, E flat and C

Singing
Singing
Musical Theatre

Ensemble Performance
Woodwind
Brass
Percussion
Strings
Mixed Ensemble

References

Sources
2012 Manual of Syllabuses. Australian Music Examinations Board. Victoria, 2011. ISSN 0729-3569

External links
 Australian Music Examinations Board

Academic degrees of Australia
Performing arts education in Australia